Thure Adolf Hellström (30 May 1880 in Koivisto – 23 December 1946 in Helsinki) was a Finnish architect working on railroad stations for Rautatiehallitus (The Railroad Board) with Bruno Granholm.

Hellström designed wooden railway station buildings at Kemi - Rovaniemi, Joensuu-Nurmes, Seinäjoki-Kaskinen, Perälä-Kristinestad, Pieksämäki-Savonlinna and Sciences-Pieksämäki. His early style is Art Nouveau.

Hellström also designed Neoclassical Station buildings.

Later, he designed more substantial buildings in stone such as Hämeenlinna, Ore, Kuopio, Pori, Riihimäki railway stations, and in 1935 in brick, Gulf station.

Stations designed by Hellström

Some of Hellström's original buildings have since been demolished, but others remain in active use.

Hämeenlinna railway station (finished in 1921)
Kuopio railway station
Malmi railway station
Pori railway station
Riihimäki railway station
Lahti railway station (finished in 1935)
Tampere railway station (finished in 1936)

Source 
Husbyggnaderna vid statens järnvägar. Finska statsjärnvägarne 1862–1912 11, Thure Hellström, Helsingfors, 1915, 314.

References

External links

1880 births
1946 deaths
People from Primorsk, Leningrad Oblast
People from Viipuri Province (Grand Duchy of Finland)
Swedish-speaking Finns
Finnish architects
Finnish people in rail transport
Art Nouveau architects